Ciudad del Carmen International Airport  is an international airport located in Ciudad del Carmen, Campeche, Mexico. It handles national and international air traffic of the city of Ciudad del Carmen. It is operated by Aeropuertos y Servicios Auxiliares, a federal government-owned corporation.

The contraction in the oil and petrochemical activity in the area had a negative impact on the airport's operations. All scheduled international flights were canceled, and from a peak of 661,901 passengers in 2014, the airport handled 322,401 passengers in 2021 and 339,294 in 2022.

Airlines and destinations

Passenger

Cargo

Helicopters flights

Statistics

Passengers

See also 

 List of the busiest airports in Mexico

References

External links
 Ciudad del Carmen Intl. Airport

Airports in Campeche